Reach for the Sky is the seventh studio album by the rock group the Allman Brothers Band, released in 1980. It was the last album to feature drummer Jai Johanny Johanson until his return on the Seven Turns album.

Reach for the Sky was the first Allman Brothers Band album to be released by a label other than Capricorn Records. It was their second album with Dan Toler on guitar and David Goldflies on bass. The band recorded the album at Pyramid Eye Studios in Lookout Mountain, Georgia, a studio that Scott McClellan founded. The back cover photograph shows the band atop Sunset Rock on Lookout Mountain's western brow in Tennessee.

Track listing

Side one
 "Hell & High Water" (Dickey Betts) – 3:37
 "Mystery Woman" (Gregg Allman, Dan Toler) – 3:35
 "From the Madness of the West" (Betts) – 6:37
 "I Got a Right to Be Wrong" (Betts) – 3:44

Side two
 "Angeline" (Betts, Johnny Cobb, Mike Lawler) – 3:43
 "Famous Last Words" (Betts, Bonnie Bramlett) – 2:48
 "Keep On Keepin' On" (Betts, Toler) – 4:11
 "So Long" (Allman, Toler) – 6:54

Personnel
Gregg Allman – keyboards, lead vocals
Dickey Betts – guitar, co-lead vocals on 1, lead vocals on 4, 6
Dan Toler – guitar
David Goldflies – bass guitar
Butch Trucks – drums, percussion
Jai Johanny Johanson – drums

References

1980 albums
The Allman Brothers Band albums
Arista Records albums